Forgive Me, Leonard Peacock is a novel written by Matthew Quick about a 17-year-old high school senior named Leonard Peacock who plans to shoot Asher Beal, his former best friend, and then subsequently kill himself, on his birthday.

Film adaptation 
In October 2017, Channing Tatum announced that plans for a movie adaptation, upon which he had been working in association with the Weinstein Company, were no longer to continue in the wake of allegations of sexual assaults by Harvey Weinstein. The movie was to have been Tatum's directorial debut.

References

2013 American novels
Novels by Matthew Quick
American young adult novels
Little, Brown and Company books